Hemlata is a feminine given name. Notable persons with the name include:

Hemlata (singer) (born 1954), Bollywood singer
Hemlata Talesra (born 1944), Indian educationalist
Hemlata Kala (born 1975), Indian cricketer
Hemlata Negi, Indian politician
Hemlata Gupta, Indian doctor
Hemlata Chaudhary, Indian politician
Hemlata Divakar, Indian politician

Indian feminine given names